The Fox Valley Park District was founded in 1947 to protect scenic vistas and land alongside the Fox River.

It is the second largest park district in Illinois, serving a population of more than 230,000 that includes the communities of Aurora, North Aurora, Montgomery and portions of Sugar Grove.

In 2009, Fox Valley was awarded a National Gold Medal award for excellence in parks in recreation.

The Park District is governed by a seven-member Board of Trustees. Each member is appointed by either the Kane County or DuPage County Board and serves a four-year term.

References

Park districts in Illinois
Protected areas of DuPage County, Illinois
Protected areas of Kane County, Illinois
Protected areas of Kendall County, Illinois
Protected areas of Will County, Illinois
1947 establishments in Illinois